Bafruiyeh Rural District is in Bafruiyeh District of Meybod County, Yazd province, Iran. At the National Census of 2006, its population was 8,399 in 2,296 households, when it was in the Central District. There were 3,866 inhabitants in 908 households at the following census of 2011. At the most recent census of 2016, the population of the rural district was 3,197 in 946 households, by which time the rural district and the city of Bafruiyeh had been separated from the Central District to become Bafruiyeh District and divided into two rural districts and the city. The largest of its 72 villages was Mazraeh Bideh, with 2,137 people.

References 

Meybod County

Rural Districts of Yazd Province

Populated places in Yazd Province

Populated places in Meybod County